Neoceratodontidae is a family of lungfish containing the extant Australian lungfish and several extinct genera. It and Lepidosirenidae represent the only lungfish families still extant.

Fossils from this family are first known from Triassic-aged sediments in Kyrgyzstan, but phylogenetic evidence indicates that it first originated near the end of the Carboniferous period. Despite their name, they are in fact basal to the related genus Ceratodus (and thus diverged before Ceratodus did), rather than vice versa.

References 

Lungfish
Extant Middle Triassic first appearances
Fish families